Alvarado is a city and municipality in the Tolima department of Colombia.  The population of the municipality was 7,589 as of the 1993 census.

Municipalities of Tolima Department